Dan Korneff is an American music producer, mixer, and engineer based in Long Island, New York. Former owner of House of Loud Studios, he has worked with several prominent rock bands, most notably Breaking Benjamin, Paramore, Papa Roach, Lamb of God and My Chemical Romance.

Selected discography

References

External links
This Is Noise Management
Allmusic.com
Discogs.com
ARTISTdirect Music

Record producers from New York (state)
Living people
Year of birth missing (living people)
People from Long Island